Vanestan (also Romanized as Vanestān; also known as Vanistan) is a village in Ozomdel-e Jonubi Rural District, in the Central District of Varzaqan County, East Azerbaijan Province, Iran. At the 2006 census, its population was 245, in 58 families.

References 

Towns and villages in Varzaqan County